Waqra Willka (Quechua waqra horn, willka grandchild; great-grandson; lineage; minor god in the Inca culture, an image of the Willkanuta valley worshipped as God; holy, sacred, divine, willka or wilka Anadenanthera colubrina (a tree), Hispanicized spelling Huacravilca) is a   mountain in the Andes of Peru. It is located in the Junín Region, Huancayo Province, Chongos Alto District. Waqra Willka lies east of Wira Challwa. A couple of small lakes named Yuraqqucha ("white lake"), Anqasqucha ("blue lake"), Challwaqucha ("fish lake") and Antaqucha ("copper lake") are situated at the feet of the mountain.

References

Mountains of Junín Region
Mountains of Peru